The 2018 Seattle Sounders FC 2 season is the club's fourth year of existence, and their fourth season in the United Soccer League, the second tier of the United States Soccer Pyramid. This is the 1st season of the soccer team playing in the Tacoma, Washington.

Current roster

Competitions

Preseason

Friendlies

USL regular season

Standings

Results summary

Results by matchday

Matches

Statistics

Appearances and goals

Numbers after plus-sign(+) denote appearances as a substitute.

 

|-
|colspan="14"|Players who left the club during the season:

Top scorers
{| class="wikitable" style="font-size: 95%; text-align: center;"
|-
!width=30|Rank
!width=30|Position
!width=30|Number
!width=175|Name
!width=75|
!width=75|
!width=75|Total
|-
|rowspan="1"|1
|FW
|74
|align="left"| David Estrada
|11
|0
|11
|-
|rowspan="2"|2
|FW
|27
|align="left"| Lamar Neagle
|4
|0
|4
|-
|FW
|99
|align="left"| Felix Chenkam
|4
|0
|4
|-
|rowspan="3"|4
|MF
|23
|align="left"| Henry Wingo
|3
|0
|3
|-
|FW
|38
|align="left"| Azriel Gonzalez
|3
|0
|3
|-
|MF
|98
|align="left"| Antonee Burke-Gilroy
|3
|0
|3
|-
|rowspan="4"|7
|FW
|37
|align="left"| Shandon Hopeau
|2
|0
|2
|-
|FW
|48
|align="left"| Alec Díaz
|2
|0
|2
|-
|MF
|88
|align="left"| Ray Saari
|2
|0
|2
|-
|MF
|89
|align="left"| Jesse Daley
|2
|0
|2
|-
|rowspan="4"|11
|MF
|16
|align="left"| Alex Roldan
|1
|0
|1
|-
|MF
|31
|align="left"| Nick Hinds
|1
|0
|1
|-
|MF
|56
|align="left"| Josh Atencio
|1
|0
|1
|-
|FW
|71
|align="left"| David Olsen
|1
|0
|1
|-
!colspan="4"|Total
! 40
! 0
! 40

Disciplinary record
{| class="wikitable" style="text-align:center;"
|-
| rowspan="2" !width=15|
| rowspan="2" !width=15|
| rowspan="2" !width=120|Player
| colspan="3"|Regular Season
| colspan="3"|Playoffs
| colspan="3"|Total
|-
!width=34; background:#fe9;"|
!width=34; background:#fe9;"|
!width=34; background:#ff8888;"|
!width=34; background:#fe9;"|
!width=34; background:#fe9;"|
!width=34; background:#ff8888;"|
!width=34; background:#fe9;"|
!width=34; background:#fe9;"|
!width=34; background:#ff8888;"|
|-
|-
|| 15 || |DF ||align=left| Tony Alfaro || |5|| |1|| |0|| |0|||0|| |0|| |5|| |1|| |0
|-
|-
|| 16 || |MF ||align=left| Alex Roldan || |2|| |0|| |0|| |0|||0|| |0|| |2|| |0|| |0
|-
|-
|| 23 || |MF ||align=left| Henry Wingo || |1|| |0|| |0|| |0|||0|| |0|| |1|| |0|| |0
|-
|-
|| 27 || |FW ||align=left| Lamar Neagle || |3|| |0|| |0|| |0|||0|| |0|| |3|| |0|| |0
|-
|-
|| 31 || |DF ||align=left| Nick Hinds || |3|| |0|| |0|| |0|||0|| |0|| |3|| |0|| |0
|-
|-
|| 33 || |DF ||align=left| Sam Rogers || |1|| |0|| |0|| |0|||0|| |0|| |1|| |0|| |0
|-
|-
|| 34 || |DF ||align=left| Ibrahim Usman || |4|| |0|| |0|| |0|||0|| |0|| |4|| |0|| |0
|-
|-
|| 36 || |DF ||align=left| Denso Ulysse || |7|| |0|| |1|| |0|||0|| |0|| |7|| |0|| |1
|-
|-
|| 37 || |MF ||align=left| Shandon Hopeau || |1|| |0|| |0|| |0|||0|| |0|| |1|| |0|| |0
|-
|-
|| 38 || |MF ||align=left| Azriel Gonzalez || |1|| |0|| |0|| |0|||0|| |0|| |1|| |0|| |0
|-
|-
|| 41 || |DF ||align=left| Khai Brisco || |2|| |0|| |0|| |0|||0|| |0|| |2|| |0|| |0
|-
|-
|| 45 || |MF ||align=left| Blake Malone || |1|| |0|| |0|| |0|||0|| |0|| |1|| |0|| |0
|-
|-
|| 50 || |MF ||align=left| Marlon Vargas || |1|| |0|| |0|| |0|||0|| |0|| |1|| |0|| |0
|-
|-
|| 57 || |MF ||align=left| Gio Miglietti || |1|| |0|| |0|| |0|||0|| |0|| |1|| |0|| |0
|-
|-
|| 58 || |DF ||align=left| Sakari Carter || |1|| |0|| |0|| |0|||0|| |0|| |1|| |0|| |0
|-
|-
|| 70 || |MF ||align=left| Handwalla Bwana || |1|| |0|| |0|| |0|||0|| |0|| |1|| |0|| |0
|-
|-
|| 71 || |FW ||align=left| David Olsen || |3|| |1|| |0|| |0|||0|| |0|| |3|| |1|| |0
|-
|-
|| 74 || |FW ||align=left| David Estrada || |1|| |0|| |0|| |0|||0|| |0|| |1|| |0|| |0
|-
|-
|| 77 || |MF ||align=left| Francisco Narbón || |3|| |0|| |0|| |0|||0|| |0|| |3|| |0|| |0
|-
|-
|| 88 || |MF ||align=left| Ray Saari || |4|| |1|| |0|| |0|||0|| |0|| |4|| |1|| |0
|-
|-
|| 89 || |MF ||align=left| Jesse Daley || |8|| |0|| |0|| |0|||0|| |0|| |8|| |0|| |0
|-
|-
|| 92 || |DF ||align=left| Rodrigue Ele || |7|| |0|| |1|| |0|||0|| |0|| |7|| |0|| |1
|-
|-
|| 96 || |DF ||align=left| Jalen Markey || |2|| |0|| |0|| |0|||0|| |0|| |2|| |0|| |0
|-
|-
|| 98 || |MF ||align=left| Antonee Burke-Gilroy || |4|| |0|| |0|| |0|||0|| |0|| |4|| |0|| |0
|-
|-
|| 99 || |FW ||align=left| Felix Chenkam || |1|| |0|| |0|| |0|||0|| |0|| |1|| |0|| |0
|-
!colspan=3|Total !!68!!3!!2!!0!!0!!0!!68!!3!!2

Honors and awards

Team of the Week

USL 20 under 20

Transfers 

For transfers in, dates listed are when Sounders FC 2 officially signed the players to the roster. Transactions where only the rights to the players are acquired are not listed. For transfers out, dates listed are when Sounders FC 2 officially removed the players from its roster, not when they signed with another club. If a player later signed with another club, his new club will be noted, but the date listed here remains the one when he was officially removed from Sounders FC 2 roster.

In

Out

References 

American soccer clubs 2018 season
2018 USL season
2018 in sports in Washington (state)
Soccer in Washington (state)
Tacoma Defiance seasons